Gauss is a large lunar impact crater, named after Carl Friedrich Gauss, that is located near the northeastern limb of the Moon's near side. It belongs to a category of lunar formations called a walled plain, meaning that it has a diameter of at least 110 kilometers, with a somewhat sunken floor and little or no central massif. Due to its location, this crater appears considerably foreshortened when viewed from the Earth, and its visibility is affected by libration.

To the northeast of Gauss is Riemann, another walled plain that lies even closer to the limb. Southwest of Gauss is the crater pair of Hahn and Berosus. Almost directly southward is Seneca.

The rim of Gauss is better formed in the northern half, and the inner walls have some terracing along the northwest and appear slumped in the northeast. The southern half of the rim is somewhat more eroded.

The interior floor is fairly flat in places, with several craters marking the surface in the southern half. There is also a small crater, Gauss B, lying along the interior of the eastern rim, with the smaller Gauss A lying across the rim just to the northeast of Gauss B. The floor of Gauss is also marked by several clefts, particularly along the eastern and northwestern edges. The uneven crater rims in the south and a series of rises in the north gives the appearance of a ridge line that traverses the crater floor from north to south.

Views

Satellite craters 

By convention these features are identified on lunar maps by placing the letter on the side of the crater midpoint that is closest to Gauss.

See also 
 1001 Gaussia, asteroid named after Gauss
 List of craters on the Moon

References

External links 
 Gaussian Blur, Lunar Photo of the Day, February 16, 2006

Impact craters on the Moon
Crater